Guildford railway station is at one of three main railway junctions on the Portsmouth Direct Line and serves the town of Guildford in Surrey, England. It is  down the line from  via Woking.

Guildford station is the larger, more frequently and more diversely served of the two stations in Guildford town centre, the other being  on the New Guildford Line.

History 

The station was opened by the London and South Western Railway (LSWR) on 5 May 1845, but was substantially enlarged and rebuilt in 1880.
 
The Reading, Guildford and Reigate Railway opened its services on 4 July 1849, and was operated by the South Eastern Railway. On the latter line is the other Guildford station, London Road. The line to it describes a curve around the town on an embankment, crossing the River Wey by a high bridge.

Guildford station was also the northern terminus of the, now-closed, Cranleigh Line which was opened 2 October 1865 by the London Brighton and South Coast Railway and closed almost one hundred years later on 12 June 1965.

Accidents and incidents
On 8 November 1952, an electric multiple unit suffered a brake malfunction approaching the station. It overran signals and collided with a stationary steam locomotive. Two people were killed and 37 were injured.
On 28 July 1971, a parcels train was derailed at the station.
 On 7 July 2017, an explosion occurred in an underframe equipment case of unit 455901 at Guildford station. No injuries occurred. The cause of the explosion was a faulty capacitor which had been fitted when the units' electrical equipment was upgraded.

Platform layout 

The main station buildings are on the Down side. At the end of the Down side platform is a bay for the New Guildford Line. There are now three islands with seven platform faces plus the bay linked by both a long footbridge and a subway.  Platforms 6 and 7 are opposite sides of the same line: these were used for unloading mail and parcels until the mid-1990s. The station was completely rebuilt (except for the platforms) by British Rail in the late 1980s.

Platform 2 – Stopping services to London Waterloo via Cobham
Platform 3 – Stopping services to London Waterloo via  [Small number of weekday services. Otherwise Sundays only]
Platform 4 – Fast and stopping services towards Portsmouth; semi-fast services to 
Platform 5 – Fast services to London Waterloo
Platform 7 – Platform not in use
Services to Ascot via Aldershot depart from either this platform or platform 6. 

Platforms 6 and 7 are on opposite sides of the same single line. Automatic train doors only open on the platform 6 side. Today doors are not opened on platform 7 due to the live rail being on that side, hence rendering that platform disused. Platform 6 is signalled for bi-directional working – trains may approach from either direction.

Motive Power Depot
Guildford station was the site of an important motive power depot opened by the LSWR in 1845. The original building was demolished in 1887 to make room for the enlargement of the station, and was replaced by a semi-roundhouse which was substantially enlarged in 1897. This was closed and demolished in 1967. The Farnham Road multi-storey car park was built on the site in the 1990s.

Airtrack
Guildford station was to have been the southern terminus for the proposed Heathrow Airtrack rail service. Airtrack was planned to open in 2015, subject to government approval. In April 2011, BAA announced that it was abandoning the project, citing the unavailability of government subsidy and other priorities for Heathrow, such as linking to Crossrail and High Speed 2.

Services 

Guildford is served regularly by trains operated by South Western Railway and Great Western Railway.

The typical off-peak service in trains per hour is:
 4 tph to  via  (fast)
 2 tph to London Waterloo via Cobham (stopping)
 2 tph to London Waterloo via  (stopping)
 2 tph to 
Services at Guildford are operated using a mixture of rolling stock including classes: 444, 450 and 455 EMUs, and Class 165 and 166 DMUs.

References

External links 

 Photos of Guildford station

Network Rail managed stations
Transport in Guildford
Railway stations in Surrey
DfT Category B stations
Former London and South Western Railway stations
Railway stations in Great Britain opened in 1845
Railway stations served by Great Western Railway
Railway stations served by South Western Railway
Buildings and structures in Guildford